United States v. R. Enterprises, Inc., 498 U.S. 292 (1991), was a United States Supreme Court case in which the court held that the three prong test for the issuance of a subpoena in United States v. Nixon does not apply to subpoenas issued by a grand jury. The Court concluded by stating that when a grand jury subpoena is challenged on relevancy grounds, the motion to quash must be denied “unless the district court determines that there is no reasonable possibility that the materials sought will produce information relevant to the grand jury's investigation.”

Case background
A federal grand jury was investigating the shipment of pornographic materials from the state of New York into Virginia.

R. Enterprises, Inc. (a pornographic distributor) filed a motion to quash the grand jury subpoenas duces tecum (document production orders). The judge of the United States District Court for the Eastern District of Virginia denied the defendant's motion to quash. Nevertheless, the United States Court of Appeals for the Fourth Circuit reversed the District Court's decision.

Holding
The Supreme Court held that the trial standard of United States v. Nixon doesn't apply to grand juries.

References

External links 
 

United States Supreme Court cases
1991 in United States case law
United States grand jury case law
United States Supreme Court cases of the Rehnquist Court